Hajji is an honorific title given to a Muslim person who has successfully completed the Hajj to Mecca.

Hajji or Haji  may also refer to:

People 
 Haji (actress), a movie actress who starred in several Russ Meyer films
 Hajji (name)

Other uses 
 Hajji, Iran, a village in Sistan and Baluchestan Province, Iran
 Haji Ali Dargah, a mosque off the coast of Worli in Southern Mumbai
 Hajji Firuz Tepe, a neolithic complex
 Haji, a character in the anime series Blood+
 Haji, a character in the 1960s television series I Dream of Jeannie
 Haji, the Japanese word for shame
 Haji pilgrimage to the Holy Kabah

See also 
 Hagi (disambiguation)
 Hadji (disambiguation)
 Hajj (disambiguation)